In enzymology, a hydroxyacid-oxoacid transhydrogenase is an enzyme that catalyzes the chemical reaction

(S)-3-hydroxybutanoate + 2-oxoglutarate  acetoacetate + (R)-2-hydroxyglutarate

Thus, the two substrates of this enzyme are (S)-3-hydroxybutanoate and 2-oxoglutarate, whereas its two products are acetoacetate and (R)-2-hydroxyglutarate.

This enzyme belongs to the family of oxidoreductases, specifically those acting on the CH-OH group of donor with other acceptors.  The systematic name of this enzyme class is (S)-3-hydroxybutanoate:2-oxoglutarate oxidoreductase. This enzyme is also called transhydrogenase, hydroxy acid-oxo acid.

See also
 D2HGDH
 L2HGDH
 2-hydroxyglutarate synthase
 2-hydroxyglutarate dehydrogenase
 Alpha-Hydroxyglutaric acid
 2-Hydroxyglutaric aciduria

References

EC 1.1.99
Enzymes of unknown structure